Garcinia montana is a species of flowering plant of the family Clusiaceae. It is a tree endemic to Peninsular Malaysia.

References

montana
Endemic flora of Peninsular Malaysia
Trees of Peninsular Malaysia
Vulnerable plants
Taxonomy articles created by Polbot
Plants described in 1901